Yadira Del Carmen Soturno Diaz (born 18 June 1970) is a Venezuelan paralympic athlete who competes in sprinting events in international level events. She was Venezuela's first female athlete to compete at the Paralympic Games when she competed at the 2008 Summer Paralympics.

References

1970 births
Living people
Sportspeople from Maracaibo
Sportspeople from Caracas
Paralympic athletes of Venezuela
Athletes (track and field) at the 2008 Summer Paralympics
20th-century Venezuelan women
21st-century Venezuelan women